Sde Uziyahu (lit. Uzziah Field) is a moshav in southern Israel. Located near the city of Ashdod, it falls under the jurisdiction of Be'er Tuvia Regional Council.

History
Sde Uziyahu was founded in 1950 by Jewish refugees expelled from Libya. Originally named Ashdod D, Yad Shimshon and Uziyah, it was finally named after Uzziah of Judah (Uziyahu in Hebrew), who, according to the Bible, built cities in the current location of the moshav.

Sde Uziyahu was built on the land of the Palestinian Arab village of Isdud, which was depopulated in 1948.

References

Moshavim
Be'er Tuvia Regional Council
Populated places in Southern District (Israel)
Populated places established in 1950
1950 establishments in Israel
Libyan-Jewish culture in Israel